Unraveled is a 2011 American documentary film about lawyer Marc Dreier, who was arrested for orchestrating a fraud scheme that netted 750 million dollars from hedge funds and clients. Set during his house arrest, the film recounts Drier's struggle to prepare for the possibility of life imprisonment with first-person flashbacks of his actions.

The film also shows Drier's attempts to grasp his unraveling. The film was  produced and directed by Marc H. Simon of Stick Figure Productions. Other producers include Matthew Makar, Steven Cantor, and Miranda Bailey. The band Red Wanting Blue was commissioned to write an original song for the film about Dreier's experiences. The song is titled "Magic Man" and plays in its entirety in the documentary.

References

External links
 

Documentary films about lawyers
2011 films
2011 documentary films
American documentary films
Documentary films about crime in the United States
Fraud in the United States
2010s English-language films
2010s American films